The 1988–89 NCAA football bowl games were a series of post-season games played in December 1988 and January 1989 to end the 1988 NCAA Division I-A football season. A total of 17 team-competitive games, and two all-star games, were played. The post-season began with the California Bowl on December 10, 1988, and concluded on January 21, 1989, with the season-ending Senior Bowl.

Schedule

References